The 2013 Iranian Futsal 2nd Division will be divided into two phases.

The league will also be composed of 20 teams divided into two divisions of 10 teams each, whose teams will be divided geographically. Teams will play only other teams in their own division, once at home and once away for a total of 18 matches each.

Teams

Group A

Group B

Standings

Group A

Group B

Play Off 
First leg to be played 10 August 2013; return leg to be played 16 August 2013

Winner promoted to the 1st Division.

First leg

Return leg 

First leg to be played 23 August 2013; return leg to be played 30 August 2013

Winner promoted to the 1st Division.

First leg

Return leg

See also 
 2012–13 Iranian Futsal Super League
 2012–13 Iran Futsal's 1st Division
 2012–13 Persian Gulf Cup
 2012–13 Azadegan League
 2012–13 Iran Football's 2nd Division
 2012–13 Iran Football's 3rd Division
 2012–13 Hazfi Cup
 Iranian Super Cup

References 

Iran Futsal's 2nd Division seasons
3
3